Pyramid Peak is in the Lewis Range, Glacier National Park in the U.S. state of Montana. Mokowanis Lake lies just northeast of the peak, and Atsina Lake is to the west.

Climate
Based on the Köppen climate classification, it is located in an alpine subarctic climate zone with long, cold, snowy winters, and cool to warm summers. Temperatures can drop below −10 °F with wind chill factors below −30 °F.

See also
 Mountains and mountain ranges of Glacier National Park (U.S.)

References

Pyramid
Pyramid
Lewis Range
Mountains of Montana